is a former Japanese football player.

Playing career
Abe was born in Fujisawa on September 10, 1972. He joined Yomiuri (later Verdy Kawasaki) from youth team in 1991. Although his opportunity to play increased from first season, he could not regular player behind Japan national team players Kazuyoshi Miura and Nobuhiro Takeda. In 1995, he moved to Japan Football League (JFL) club Brummell Sendai (later Vegalta Sendai). He played many matches as forward. He moved to JFL club Tosu Futures in 1996 and returned to Verdy in 1997. In 1998, he moved to JFL club Brummell again. In 1999, the club was promoted to new league J2 League. From 2000, he played for J2 club Shonan Bellmare (2000) and Kawasaki Frontale (2001). He retired end of 2001 season.

Club statistics

References

External links

Kawasaki Frontale profile

1972 births
Living people
Association football people from Kanagawa Prefecture
Japanese footballers
Japan Soccer League players
J1 League players
J2 League players
Japan Football League (1992–1998) players
Tokyo Verdy players
Vegalta Sendai players
Sagan Tosu players
Shonan Bellmare players
Kawasaki Frontale players
Association football forwards